

List of creditor nations 
This is a list of the top creditor nations of the world sorted by their net international investment positions (NIIPs) per capita. A creditor nation is a sovereign state that has a positive NIIP.

The table uses the latest available data, mostly from websites approved by the International Monetary Fund, and includes Macau and Hong Kong because of their special economic statuses.  Population figures may list citizens only or total population, therefore ranking and figures may vary.

The 6 Gulf Cooperation Council countries are widely considered to be creditor nations (and perhaps some of the largest ones), but because of Islamic sensitivities about credit and debt, they seldom report their external assets and liabilities.

List of debtor nations 

This is a list of debtor nations by net international investment position per capita.

This is a list of debtor nations of the world sorted by their net international investment positions (NIIPs) per capita.  A debtor nation is a sovereign state that has a negative NIIP, i.e. a country that has net external liabilities, NOT net external assets.

The table uses data from respective national government statistical agencies, Eurostat, or IMF.  Though many do, a large portion of nations do not report data to the IMF.   Disclaimer: Note that parallel reports from government or international agencies may report vastly different data.

See also
 List of countries by net international investment position

References

Net International Investment Position Per Capita, List Of Countries By
Net International Investment Position Per Capita, List Of Countries By
Net International Investment Position Per Capita, List Of Countries By
Net International Investment Position Per Capita, List Of Countries By